Tumba Bruk was the printing company responsible for the manufacturing of the Swedish krona banknotes. The company was founded by Sveriges Riksbank in 1755 to produce banknotes, making it the world's oldest factory of its kind. In 2002, the company was sold to the current owner, banknote paper supplier Crane & Co. It is located in Tumba, close to Stockholm. The facility and its park was designated a listed building in 2001.

Background 
In 1661, Sweden's first banknotes were produced by Stockholm Banco which were used as credit notes for its customers. These notes soon became worthless, however, when Stockholm Banco went bankrupt in 1668, and banknotes were subsequently prohibited.

Banknotes received a second chance in 1701 when the predecessor to Sveriges Riksbank started handing out transportsedlar, notes that worked in a similar way to modern cheques. These notes were easily forged, since the paper used for the production of the notes was imported, and these transports were often hijacked. In order to combat this, King Adolf Frederick ordered the construction of a proper paper production facility on the grounds of present day Tumba Bruk on 23 June 1755. Paper production on a smaller scale had been going on since 1750.

References

External links

Crane AB - Official site

Manufacturing companies of Sweden
Banknote printing companies
Companies based in Stockholm County